Riviera Beach may refer to some places in the United States:

 Riviera Beach, Florida
 Riviera Beach, Maryland
 Riviera Beach, Lake Geneva, Wisconsin